The 1917 Indiana Hoosiers football team was an American football team that represented Indiana University Bloomington during the 1917 college football season. In their second season under head coach Ewald O. Stiehm, the Hoosiers compiled a 5–2 record and finished in seventh place in the Big Ten Conference. They won games against  (50–0),  (51–0), Saint Louis (40–0),  (35–0), and Purdue (37–0), and lost to Minnesota (33–9), and Ohio State (26–3).

Schedule

References

Indiana
Indiana Hoosiers football seasons
Indiana Hoosiers football